Falkovitshella ammobia is a moth species of the family Scythrididae. It was described by Mark I. Falkovitsh in 1972. It is found in Uzbekistan, Mongolia and eastern Siberia.

References

Scythrididae
Moths described in 1972
Moths of Asia